Peter and Karen McComb House is a historic home located at Poughkeepsie, Dutchess County, New York.  It was designed by architect Marcel Breuer and built in 1950–1951.  The original section is a small one- to two-story, "T"-shaped, International style frame dwelling on a concrete foundation.  Three additions were constructed in 1962, 1988, and 1994.  It is built into its site atop a steep rock ridge and features large-scale rectangular window panels.

It was added to the National Register of Historic Places in 2009.

References 

Marcel Breuer buildings
Houses on the National Register of Historic Places in New York (state)
International style architecture in New York (state)
Houses completed in 1951
Houses in Poughkeepsie, New York
National Register of Historic Places in Poughkeepsie, New York